The Departmental Council of Charente is the deliberative assembly of the Charente department in the region of Nouvelle-Aquitaine. It consists of 38 members (general councilors) from 19 cantons and its headquarters are in Angoulême.

The President of the General Council is Philippe Bouty.

Vice-Presidents 
The President of the Departmental Council is assisted by 11 vice-presidents chosen from among the departmental advisers. Each of them has a delegation of authority.

References

See also 

 Charente
 General councils of France

Charente
Charente